Jake Canuso is a Swiss-born Italian actor, best known for his role in the ITV comedy series  Benidorm, in which he played the Solana barman Mateo Castellanos from 2007 until 2018. Canuso was a professional dancer for eighteen years, working with artists including Spice Girls, Annie Lennox and Elton John.

Early life
Canuso was born near Zurich, Switzerland, to immigrants from southern Italy. He moved to the UK when he was 18 years old.

Career
Previously a dancer, Canuso appeared dressed as a ballet dancer in the music video for "No More I Love You's" by Annie Lennox. He also appeared in the video of Kakko's 1990 song "We Should Be Dancing", JX's "Son of a Gun", Alex Party's "Don't Give Me Your Life", Carter USM's "Let's Get Tattoos", 2 unlimited's "Here I Go", and Emma Bunton's  "Crickets Sing for Anamaria". Canuso also toured as a dancer for acts including the Spice Girls, Elton John and Annie Lennox. He also appeared as a dancer on Top of the Pops.

Between 2007-2018, Canuso featured in the ITV comedy series Benidorm as flirtatious barman Mateo Castellanos and is the sitcom's longest-serving actor, appearing in all 74 episodes. Canuso was chosen along with several other members of the cast to star in Benidorm Live, a touring stage adaptation of the show.

In January 2013, Canuso participated in ITV diving show Splash!, hosted by Tom Daley.

Canuso has performed in numerous pantomimes. In 2022, he appeared as Abanazar in Aladdin, which was staged at the Rhyl Pavilion Theatre.

Personal life
Canuso survived the Indian Ocean tsunami on 26 December 2004, whilst on holiday in Ko Phra Thong, Thailand. He climbed a tree after seeing the first waves, and was trapped underwater after the tree snapped. He developed aquaphobia and did not swim in water for several years.

Credits

Film

Television

Music videos

Theatre

Video games

References

External links 

Living people
Swiss male film actors
Swiss male television actors
Swiss male dancers
Swiss people of Italian descent
Swiss expatriates in England
Year of birth missing (living people)